Sunway University is a private university in Bandar Sunway, Petaling Jaya, Selangor, Malaysia. It has a 10 hectare (24 acre) campus comprising academic and residential blocks adjacent to the Sunway Lagoon theme park.

It offers undergraduate and postgraduate programmes taught in English.

The President of Sunway University, Professor Sibrandes Poppema was appointed in 2021, further strengthening the University’s capacity and strategic leadership in a global setting.  Professor Poppema joined Sunway University in 2019 after retiring as the President of University of Groningen in the Netherlands.  Professor Poppema, a Tan Sri Jeffrey Cheah Distinguished Professor is also an advisor to the establishment of the new medical school at Sunway University.

History 
Sunway University was established in 2004 as Sunway University College. It was upgraded by the Malaysian Ministry of Higher Education to full university status in January 2011 and became Sunway University.

Academic Structure 

Sunway University is a broad-based university offering academic programmes both at undergraduate level (diploma programmes and bachelor's degrees) and at postgraduate level (master's and doctoral degrees).

The university is structured into the following seven schools, each led by a dean and each comprising a number of departments, centres and institutes:
 Sunway University Business School 
 School of Engineering and Technology 
 School of Arts 
 School of Mathematical Sciences
 School of Hospitality and Service Management
 School of Medical and Life Sciences
The School of Interdisciplinary Studies
Centre for English Language Studies
Center for American Education
Jeffrey Sachs Center on Sustainable Development
Jeffrey Cheah Institute on Southeast Asia

The School of Business is the largest school in the University.

Quality Recognition 

Sunway University's academic programmes have attained accreditation and are compliant with Malaysia's framework for higher education qualifications, programme standards and quality systems as laid down by the Malaysian Qualifications Agency. Sunway University has been rated Tier5 "excellent" three times in a row by the Malaysia Rating System for University and University College Excellence (SETARA) of the Malaysian Ministry of Education, with the most recent rating obtained in "SETARA 17".

Sunway University is also rated internationally as a 5-star university overall by the university rating and ranking organisation Quacquarelli Symonds (QS), with 5-star ratings for teaching, employability, facilities, social responsibility and inclusiveness.

Academic Programmes 

The School of Business offers a diploma in business administration; bachelor's degrees in accounting and finance, business management, business studies, business analytics, global supply chain management, marketing, financial analysis, and financial economics; a master of business administration (MBA) programme as well as master's programmes in marketing and human resource management; and a doctor of philosophy programme in business. The School of Business offers the University's largest academic programme by student enrolment, the Bachelor of Science degree in Accounting and Finance.

The School of Science and Technology offers a diploma in information technology; bachelor's degrees in computer science, information systems, information systems (business analytics), mobile computing with entrepreneurship, information technology, information technology (computer networking and security), software engineering, biomedicine, biology with psychology, medical biotechnology and psychology; master's degrees in computer science, information technology, life sciences and psychology; and doctor of philosophy programmes in computer science, psychology and in biology.

The School of Arts offers degrees in communication, digital film production, contemporary music (audio technology), music performance, interior architecture, and design communication; a master's programme in visual communication and media studies; and diplomas in performing arts, interior design, and graphics and multimedia design.

The School of Mathematical Sciences offers bachelor's degrees in actuarial studies and industrial statistics, a master's programme in actuarial science, and a doctor of philosophy programme in mathematical sciences. The actuarial studies bachelor's degree was the first degree programme in Malaysia to gain full accreditation by the Malaysian Finance Accreditation Agency.

The School of Healthcare and Medical Sciences offers a diploma in nursing.

The School of Hospitality offers diplomas in culinary arts, events management, and hotel management; and bachelor's degrees in culinary management, international hospitality management, and conventions and events management.

The School of Interdisciplinary Studies offers a master's programme in sustainable development management through the Jeffrey Sachs Center for Sustainable Development, and an American Degree Transfer Programme (ADTP), through its Centre for American Education, which enables students to study part of a bachelor's degree programme and then transfer to universities in North America to complete their studies.

Research Centres and Institutes 

Sunway University has a number of research centres and institutes across various fields of studies including:
Centre for Commercial Law and Justice
Centre for Higher Education Research
Research Centre for Biomedical Physics
Centre for Research - Creation in Digital Media (CRCDM)
Centre for Virus and Vaccine Research
Jeffrey Cheah Institute on Southeast Asia (JCI), established as a think tank to undertake research and policy analysis relating to the economies, societies and cultures of southeast Asia. The Institute's president is Professor Datuk Dr Woo Wing Thye.
Jeffrey Sachs Center for Sustainable Development, which conducts research and teaching related to the implementation of the United Nations' Sustainable Development Goals in southeast Asia. The Center is chaired by Professor Jeffrey Sachs of Columbia University, USA.
Research Centre for Carbon Dioxide Capture and Utilisation
Research Centre for Crystalline Materials
Research Centre for Nano-Materials and Energy Technology
Graphene and Advanced 2D Materials Research Group
Centre for Accountability and Governance Research
Joint Research Centre in Information Technology, established in collaboration with Huizhou University, China
Future Cities Research Institute, jointly established with Lancaster University, UK
Research Centre for Human Machine Collaboration
Asia Pacific Centre for Hospitality Research
Centre for Actuarial and Analytics Research

International partnerships and collaborations 
Sunway University has a partnership with Lancaster University, UK since 2006, in which some degree programmes are offered as dual awards offered by both institutions. The partnership model was the subject of research by the UK's Quality Assurance Agency for Higher Education which produced a case study on it. Sunway University also has a collaboration with the international culinary training organisation Le Cordon Bleu which enables graduates from certain hospitality programmes to receive professional certificates from Le Cordon Bleu.

Through benefactions from the Jeffrey Cheah Foundation, professorial fellowships have been established in perpetuity both at Brasenose College, University of Oxford, and at Gonville and Caius College, University of Cambridge, to develop academic ties with Sunway University. The Jeffrey Cheah Scholars-in-Residence Programme has also been established through benefactions at Brasenose College and at Gonville and Caius College, to allow two academics or postgraduate students from Sunway University to spend up to four weeks each year for research or study in Oxford and Cambridge.

Sunway University also supports Harvard Medical School's Southeast Asia Healthcare Leadership Programme which is delivered partly at Sunway University.

Sunway University has articulation partnerships with a number of international universities to enable students to study partly at Sunway and partly at an overseas university to complete their degrees. One of the longest such partnerships has been with Western Michigan University, USA.

Governance 

Sunway University, unlike most private universities in Malaysia, is a not-for-profit institution. The university is owned and governed by the Jeffrey Cheah Foundation, overseen by an eminent Board of Trustees.

The University is managed by the Senior Management Group, chaired by the President, Professor Sibrandes Poppema, who works in tandem with the Chancellery of the University, Deans of Schools, and the support and administrative departments of the University. 

Sunway University is governed by a Board of Directors, chaired by the Chancellor, Tan Sri Dato’ Seri Dr Jeffrey Cheah, and senior industrialist, academics, civil servants and educationists.  The Board of Directors is responsible for the overall strategic direction of the University. 

Academic governance is effected by the Academic Senate, chaired by the Vice-Chancellor, which includes all full professors, deans and heads of department among its membership. The detailed responsibilities of the Board and the Senate are described in the University's constitution, which has been approved by the Ministry of Higher Education.

Sunway Education Group 

Sunway University is a member of the Sunway Education Group, which is owned by the Jeffrey Cheah Foundation. The Foundation was officially established as a registered charity in March 2010 from its predecessor Sunway Education Trust, set up in 1997. It was founded by Tan Sri Dato' Seri Dr. Jeffrey Cheah, AO, Founder and Chairman of the Sunway Group of companies. All of the educational institutions that operate under the Foundation are not-for-profit; surpluses are channelled towards scholarships and bursaries to students, as well as towards grants for research. Besides Sunway University, the Sunway Education Group includes Sunway International School, Sunway College (several campuses), Sunway-TES Centre for Accounting Excellence, and Monash University Sunway Campus, besides several other institutions.

On 25 July 2017, Sunway Education Group celebrated its 30th anniversary. The highlight of the celebration was the three-dimensional projection mapping show in which images were projected on the facade of the university's building from four projectors.

See also

 List of universities in Malaysia

References

External links 
 

2004 establishments in Malaysia
Educational institutions established in 2004
Universities and colleges in Selangor
Business schools in Malaysia
Design schools in Malaysia
Hospitality schools in Malaysia
Information technology schools in Malaysia
Subang Jaya
Sunway Group
Private universities and colleges in Malaysia